Garrett Getts Whitlock (born June 11, 1996) is an American professional baseball pitcher for the Boston Red Sox of Major League Baseball (MLB).

Amateur career
Whitlock attended Providence Christian Academy in Lilburn, Georgia. As a junior, he posted a 1.95 earned run average (ERA) along with a .369 batting average. Not selected as a high school prospect during the 2015 Major League Baseball draft, he enrolled at the University of Alabama at Birmingham where he played college baseball for the UAB Blazers. In 2016, he played collegiate summer baseball with the Chatham Anglers of the Cape Cod Baseball League. As a sophomore at UAB, he was 3–6 with a 4.07 ERA.  

After his sophomore year, he was selected by the New York Yankees in the 18th round of the 2017 Major League Baseball draft, and he signed with the team.

Professional career

New York Yankees
After signing with the Yankees, Whitlock made his professional debut in 2017 with the Gulf Coast League Yankees where he posted a 1.04 ERA in three starts. He was promoted to the Pulaski Yankees in August, and ended the season there, pitching to a 7.94 ERA in  innings. He began 2018 with the Charleston RiverDogs, and was promoted to the Tampa Yankees and Trenton Thunder during the season. In 23 games (21 starts) between the three clubs, Whitlock went 8–5 with a 1.86 ERA, a 1.11 WHIP, and 122 strikeouts over  innings. He returned to Trenton for the 2019 season, pitching to a 3–3 record with a 3.07 ERA over 14 starts, striking out 57 batters in  innings. His season ended in early July, as he underwent Tommy John surgery later that month. He did not play a minor league game in 2020 due to the cancellation of the season caused by the COVID-19 pandemic alongside still recovering from surgery.

Boston Red Sox
In December 2020, the Boston Red Sox selected Whitlock in the Rule 5 draft. He made the Red Sox' Opening Day roster in 2021. On April 4, 2021, Whitlock made his MLB debut in relief against the Baltimore Orioles, striking out five batters and allowing no runs in  innings pitched. He earned his first major league win on June 5 after pitching a scoreless  innings in relief against the Yankees in New York. On June 15, Whitlock batted in an interleague game and recorded his first career hit, a single off of Atlanta Braves reliever Edgar Santana. Whitlock was placed on the injured list on September 21 with a right pectoral strain, and activated on October 3. For the 2021 regular season, Whitlock pitched  innings in 46 relief appearances, during which he went 8–4 with a 1.96 ERA and 81 strikeouts. In the postseason, he made five relief appearances, earning one win and allowing two runs in  innings as the Red Sox advanced to the American League Championship Series.

On April 10, 2022, Whitlock signed a four-year, $18.75 million extension with the Red Sox. He opened the season as a member of Boston's bullpen, then was added to the rotation in the second-half of April. Whitlock was placed on the injured list on June 10 with right hip inflammation, and reactivated by the team on July 15. He returned to the injured list on September 21 with a right hip impingement. In 31 appearances (nine starts), Whitlock posted a 4–2 record with six saves and 3.45 ERA while striking out 82 batters in  innings.

Personal life
Whitlock and his wife, Jordan, married in November 2019.

References

External links

UAB Blazers bio

1996 births
Living people
Baseball players from Georgia (U.S. state)
Boston Red Sox players
Charleston RiverDogs players
Chatham Anglers players
Gulf Coast Yankees players
Major League Baseball pitchers
People from Snellville, Georgia
Pulaski Yankees players
Sportspeople from the Atlanta metropolitan area
Tampa Tarpons players
Trenton Thunder players
UAB Blazers baseball players